The Book of Habakkuk is the eighth book of the 12 minor prophets of the Bible. It is attributed to the prophet Habakkuk, and was probably composed in the late 7th century BC.

Of the three chapters in the book, the first two are a dialogue between Yahweh and the prophet. The message that "the just shall live by his faith" plays an important role in Christian thought. It is used in the Epistle to the Romans, Epistle to the Galatians, and the Epistle to the Hebrews as the starting point of the concept of faith.  A copy of these chapters is included in the Habakkuk Commentary, found among the Dead Sea Scrolls. Chapter 3 may be an independent addition, now recognized as a liturgical piece, but was possibly written by the same author as chapters 1 and 2.

Background 

The prophet Habakkuk is generally believed to have written his book in the mid-to-late 7th century BC, not long before the Babylonians' siege and capture of Jerusalem in 586 BC.

Author

Habakkuk identifies himself as a prophet in the opening verse. Due to the liturgical nature of the book of Habakkuk, there have been some scholars who think that the author may have been a temple prophet. Temple prophets are described in 1 Chronicles 25:1 as using lyres, harps and cymbals. Some feel that this is echoed in Habakkuk 3:19b, and that Habakkuk may have been a Levite and singer in the Temple.

There is no biographical information on the prophet Habakkuk. The only canonical information that exists comes from the book that is named for him.  His name comes either from the Hebrew word חבק (ḥavaq) meaning "embrace" or else from an Akkadian word hambakuku for a kind of plant.

Although his name does not appear in any other part of the Jewish Bible, Rabbinic tradition holds Habakkuk to be the Shunammite woman's son, who was restored to life by Elisha in 2 Kings 4:16. The prophet Habakkuk is also mentioned in the narrative of Bel and the Dragon, part of the deuterocanonical additions to Daniel in a late section of that book. In the superscription of the Old Greek version, Habakkuk is called the son of Joshua of the tribe of Levi. In this book Habakkuk is lifted by an angel to Babylon to provide Daniel with some food while he is in the lion's den.

Historical context

It is unknown when Habakkuk lived and preached, but the reference to the rise and advance of the Chaldeans in 1:6–11 places him in the middle to last quarter of the 7th century BC. One possible period might be during the reign of Jehoiakim, from 609 to 598 BC. The reasoning for this date is that it is during his reign that the Neo-Babylonian Empire of the Chaldeans was growing in power. The Babylonians marched against Jerusalem in 598 BC. Jehoiakim died while the Babylonians were marching towards Jerusalem and Jehoiakim's eighteen-year-old son Jehoiachin assumed the throne. Upon the Babylonians' arrival, Jehoiachin and his advisors surrendered Jerusalem after a short time.  With the transition of rulers and the young age and inexperience of Jehoiachin, they were not able to stand against Chaldean forces. There is a sense of an intimate knowledge of the Babylonian brutality in 1:12–17.

Overview 

The book of Habakkuk is a book of the Tanakh (the Old Testament) and stands eighth in a section known as the 12 Minor Prophets in the Masoretic and Greek texts. In the Masoretic listing, it follows Nahum and precedes Zephaniah, who are considered to be his contemporaries.

The book consists of three chapters and the book is neatly divided into three different genres:

 A discussion between God and Habakkuk
 An Oracle of Woe
 A Psalm

Themes 

The major theme of Habakkuk is trying to grow from a faith of perplexity and doubt to the height of absolute trust in God. Habakkuk addresses his concerns over the fact that God will use the Babylonian empire to execute judgment on Judah for their sins.

Habakkuk openly questions the wisdom of God. In the first part of the first chapter, the Prophet sees the injustice among his people and asks why God does not take action.  "Yahweh, how long will I cry, and you will not hear? I cry out to you “Violence!” and will you not save?" – (Habakkuk 1:2)

In the middle part of Chapter 1, God explains that he will send the Chaldeans (also known as the Babylonians) to punish his people. In 1:5: "Look among the nations, watch, and wonder marvelously; for I am working a work in your days, which you will not believe though it is told you." In 1:6: "For, behold, I raise up the Chaldeans, that bitter and hasty nation, that march through the breadth of the earth, to possess dwelling places that are not theirs."

One of the "Eighteen Emendations to the Hebrew Scriptures" appears at 1:12. According to the professional Jewish scribes, the Sopherim, the text of 1:12 was changed from "You [God] do not die" to "We shall not die." The Sopherim considered it disrespectful to say to God, "You do not die."

In the final part of the first chapter, the prophet expresses shock at God's choice of instrument for judgment. in 1:13: "You who have purer eyes than to see evil, and who cannot look on perversity, why do you tolerate those who deal treacherously, and keep silent when the wicked swallows up the man who is more righteous than he[...]?"

In Chapter 2, he awaits God's response to his challenge. God explains that He will also judge the Chaldeans, and much more harshly. "Because you have plundered many nations, all the remnant of the peoples will plunder you, because of men’s blood, and for the violence done to the land, to the city and to all who dwell in it. Woe to him who gets an evil gain for his house." (Habakkuk 2:8-9)

Finally, in Chapter 3, Habakkuk expresses his ultimate faith in God, even if he doesn't fully understand.
"For though the fig tree doesn’t flourish, nor fruit be in the vines; the labor of the olive fails, the fields yield no food; the flocks are cut off from the fold, and there is no herd in the stalls: 3:18 yet I will rejoice in Yahweh. I will be joyful in the God of my salvation!"

Importance 
The book of Habakkuk is accepted as canonical by adherents of the Jewish and Christian faiths.  A commentary on the first two chapters of the book was found among the Dead Sea Scrolls at Qumran.  Passages from Habakkuk are quoted by authors of the New Testament, and its message has inspired modern Christian hymn writers.

Judaism
The Book of Habakkuk is the eighth book of the Twelve Prophets of the Hebrew Bible, and this collection appears in all copies of texts of the Septuagint, the Ancient Greek translation of the Hebrew Bible completed by 132 BC.  Likewise, the book of Sirach (or Ecclesiasticus), also written in the 2nd century BC, mentions "The Twelve Prophets".

A partial copy of Habakkuk itself is included in the Habakkuk Commentary, a pesher found among the original seven Dead Sea Scrolls discovered in 1947.  The Commentary contains a copy of the first two chapters of Habakkuk, but not of the third chapter.  The writer of the pesher draws a comparison between the Babylonian invasion of the original text and the Roman threat of the writer's own period.  What is even more significant than the commentary in the pesher is the quoted text of Habakkuk itself.  The divergences between the Hebrew text of the scroll and the standard Masoretic Text are startlingly minimal.  The biggest differences are word order, small grammatical variations, addition or omission of conjunctions, and spelling variations, but these are small enough to not to damage the meaning of the text.

Some scholars suggest that Chapter 3 may be a later independent addition to the book, in part because it is not included among the Dead Sea Scrolls.  However, this chapter does appear in all copies of the Septuagint, as well as in texts from as early as the 3rd century BC.  This final chapter is a poetic praise of God, and has some similarities with texts found in the Book of Daniel. However, the fact that the third chapter is written in a different style, as a liturgical piece, does not necessarily mean that Habakkuk was not also its author.  Its omission from the Dead Sea Scrolls is attributed to the inability of the Qumran sect to fit Habakkuk's theology with their own narrow viewpoint.

The Talmud (Makkot 24a) mentions that various Biblical figures summarized the 613 commandments into categories that encapsulated all of the 613.  At the end of this discussion, the Talmud concludes "Habakkuk came and established [the 613 mitzvoth] upon one, as it is stated: 'But the righteous person shall live by his faith' (Habakkuk 2:4)", meaning that faith encapsulates all of the other commandments.

Christianity

Habakkuk 2:4 is well known in Christianity:
 Behold, his soul is puffed up; it is not upright within him,
  but the righteous shall live by his faith.
The second half of this verse is quoted by some of the earliest Christian writers.  Although this passage is only three words in the original Hebrew, it is quoted three times in the New Testament. Paul the Apostle quotes this verse twice in his epistles: in Epistle to the Romans. and again in Epistle to the Galatians. In doing so, Paul extends Habakkuk's original concept of righteous living at the present time into a future life.  The same verse is quoted in Epistle to the Hebrews, where Habakkuk's vision is tied to Christ and used to comfort the church during a period of persecution.  These three epistles are considered to be "the three great doctrinal books of the New Testament," and Habakkuk's statement concerning faith forms the backbone of each book.

Modern Christian hymns have been inspired by the words of the prophet Habakkuk. The Christian hymn "The Lord is in His Holy Temple", written in 1900 by William J. Kirkpatrick, is based on verse 2:20. The fourth verse of William Cowper's hymn "Sometimes a Light Surprises", written in 1779, quotes Habakkuk 3:17–18.

Cultural references 
Irish composer Charles Villiers Stanford set slightly revised portions of text from the first and second chapters of Habakkuk in his piece for SATB choir, Soprano and Tenor soloist and organ, "For Lo, I Raise Up".

Notes

Citations

References

External links 

Historic manuscripts
 The Commentary on Habakkuk Scroll, The Digital Dead Sea Scrolls, hosted by the Israel Museum, Jerusalem.

Jewish translations
 Chavakuk – Habakkuk (Judaica Press) translation [with Rashi's commentary] at Chabad.org

Christian translations
Online Bible at GospelHall.org (ESV, KJV, Darby, American Standard Version, Bible in Basic English)
  Various versions

Further information
 A Brief Introduction to The Prophecy of Habakkuk for Contemporary Readers (Christian Perspective)
 Introduction to the book of Habakkuk from the NIV Study Bible
 Introduction to the Book of HabakkukForward Movement Publications

 
7th-century BC books
Twelve Minor Prophets